Gordon L. Iseminger is an American author and historian. A professor of history at the University of North Dakota, he is the university's longest-serving faculty member, having joined the faculty in 1962. His work has appeared in the North Dakota Quarterly, Minnesota History, Agricultural History, Pennsylvania History, The Journal of American History, and the Middle East Journal, as well as the Encyclopedia of the Great Plains.

Iseminger is a graduate of Augustana College, the University of South Dakota, and the University of Oklahoma. He has served on the Grand Forks Historic Preservation Commission and was named a Chester Fritz Distinguished Professor in 2003.

Biography
A History of American-Canadian Commercial Reciprocity, 1854-1936 (1960)
Britain's Eastern Policy and the Ottoman Christians, 1856-1877 (1965)
The Americanization of Christina Hillius: German-Russian Emigrant to North Dakota (1986)
The Quartzite Border: Surveying and Marking the North Dakota-South Dakota Boundary, 1891-1892 (1988)

References

External links
Works by Gordon Iseminger at WorldCat

20th-century American non-fiction writers
21st-century American historians
21st-century American male writers
University of North Dakota faculty
Writers from North Dakota
Living people
Year of birth missing (living people)
Place of birth missing (living people)
University of South Dakota alumni
University of Oklahoma alumni
Augustana University alumni
American male non-fiction writers
20th-century American male writers